The 2020 Women's Super Series was the sixth Women's Super Series competition that took place in Ireland. The tournament was originally scheduled to take place in May and June with 3 teams taking part, but was delayed and restructured due to the COVID-19 pandemic. The tournament eventually took place in August and September, with two teams taking part (Scorchers and Typhoons, with Dragons leaving the competition) and eight 50 over matches taking place. Typhoons won the tournament, achieving their first Super Series title.

Competition format
The two teams played eight 50 over matches against each other in a league system.

The league worked on a points system with positions being based on the total points. Points were awarded as follows:

Win: 2 points. 
Tie: 1 point. 
Loss: 0 points.
Abandoned/No Result: 1 point.

Squads

Source: Cricket Ireland

Points table

Source: CricketArchive

Fixtures

Statistics

Most runs

Source: CricketArchive

Most wickets

Source: CricketArchive

References

External links
Series home at ESPN Cricinfo

Women's Super Series
2020 in Irish cricket